The Holden Utility (VG) is a full-size utility that was produced by the Australian manufacturer Holden from 1990 to 1991. It was based upon the Holden Commodore VN) released in 1988, and was the first utility in Holden's Commodore range. It was not badged as part of the Commodore range.

It was replaced by the Holden Ute VP in January 1992.

Overview 
Holden had been without a locally designed utility since the demise of the WB series of light commercials in 1984. In the later years of this decade, the Japanese-made Isuzu-sourced Rodeo had been Holden's offering in this market, and it wasn't until the introduction of the new Commodore VN in 1988 that Holden began designing their locally-built replacement.

The VG was built on a lengthened version of the VN chassis (the longest within the Commodore VN / Statesman VQ range), with extra strengthening to cater for the increased payload. Unlike the previous WB, the new VG did not offer a cab-chassis version with an increased one-tonne payload.

The VG shared the frontal appearance of the VN Commodore but its 2-door cabin featured a raised roofline, marketed as able to accommodate the Akubra hat favoured by many "bushies".

The base engine was initially the 3.8L LN3 (or HV6) OHV V6, which was replaced in November with the revised L27 (or EV6) version of the engine. The HEC 5000i V8 was available as an option for the Ute S only. Buyers had the choice of either a 4-speed automatic or 5-speed manual available for both the V6 and V8 engines.

Models 
Buyers had a choice of two models, the base Utility or the sportier Utility S. Unlike the VN sedan, a SS model was not available in the VG range, nor was the VG produced as a Toyota Lexcen.

Total production of all models was 5690 vehicles.

Utility 
The Utility was the base model of the VG range. Its standard features included:
 3.8-litre  V6 engine
 5-speed manual transmission
 Power steering
 Larger 68-litre fuel tank 
 Power assisted brakes on all four wheels, 271mm by 21mm vented discs front, 278mm by 10.5mm solid discs rear
 14 inch steel wheels fitted with P195/75 R-14 95H steel belted radials
 AM/FM radio cassette with 2-speakers
 Height adjustable driver's seat
 Vinyl seat trim
 Rubber cabin flooring

Options included:
 4-speed automatic transmission
 Air conditioning
 3-seat bench with column shift (auto only)

Pricing of the Utility when new was:
 3.8L V6 manual - $22,365
 3.8L V6 automatic - $22,913

Utility S 
The Utility S was the sports variant of the VG range. Its features (in addition to or replacing those of the base Utility) included:
 Tachometer
 Sports trim interior
 Sports badges & exterior striping
 15 inch alloy wheels fitted with P205/65 R-15 92H steel belted radials
 Larger 289mm by 22mm vented disc brakes (front and rear, V8 only)

Options included:
 5.0 L  V8 engine
 Air conditioning
 Metallic Paint

Pricing of the Utility S when new was:
 3.8L V6 manual - $22,365
 3.8L V6 automatic - $22,913
 5.0L V8 manual - $24,883
 5.0L V8 automatic - $25,432

HSV Range

Maloo 
The VG marked the first appearance of HSV's Maloo high performance utility in October 1990.

The Maloo featured the standard VG's MacPherson-strut front suspension but with revised settings based on HSV's VN SV5000. The five-link live rear axle featured stiffer springs similar to those used in the VL wagon.

Standard features included:
 Cold air intake
 Dual exhaust
 Larger 327mm by 28mm vented front disc brakes
 278mm by 28mm  vented rear disc brakes
 16x8 inch alloy wheels fitted with Pirelli low-profile tyres
 Contoured front sports seats
 Momo leather steering wheel
 Soft tonneau cover
 Unique body kit (based on SV3800 and SV89)
 Limited slip differential with 3.08:1 final drive ratio

A total of 132 vehicles were produced.

Exports
It is not known whether there were any commercial exports of the VG Utility.

Notes

References

External links 

Cars of Australia
VN
Full-size vehicles
Rear-wheel-drive vehicles
Coupé utilities
Cars introduced in 1990
1990s cars
Cars discontinued in 1991